Wahlstedt is a town in the district of Segeberg in Schleswig-Holstein, Germany.

Geography
The town lies about 50 km north of Hamburg, 40 km south of Kiel and 30 km west of Lübeck.  It is about seven kilometers west of Bad Segeberg on the edge of the Segeberg Forest.

Politics
After the 2003 election, the 19 seats of the Wahlstedt city council are filled by nine CDU members, eight SPD members, and two FDP members.

Economy 
The headquarters of German confectionery retailer Hussel is in Wahlstedt.

International relations

Wahlstedt is twinned with:
 Bjerringbro, Denmark 1969 - 2007

References

Official Homepage 

Segeberg